The Autonomous University  of Chiriqui, in Spanish Universidad Autónoma de Chiriquí (UNACHI), is a Panamanian university. It was founded in 1995, and is the third autonomous state institution of higher education and the first in the western region of the country.

Faculties
The university consists of these faculties:
 Business Administration and Accounting
 Public Administration
 Education Sciences
 Natural and Exact Sciences
 Social Communication
 Law and Political Sciences
 Economy
 Nursing
 Humanities
 Medicine

Campuses
The university also has regional campuses and college extensions in the Chiriquí Province, to give more people access to higher education. Those campuses and extensions are:

 Centro Universitario de Barú (CRUBA)
 Extensión Universitaria de Oriente
 Extensión Universitaria de Tierras Altas
 Universidad Popular de Alanje (UNIPAL)
 Extensión Universitaria de Boquete

References

External links
 Official website

Chiriqui
Buildings and structures in Chiriquí Province
1995 establishments in Panama
Educational institutions established in 1995